In probability theory, the law of total covariance, covariance decomposition formula, or conditional covariance formula states that if X, Y, and Z are random variables on the same probability space, and the covariance of X and Y is finite, then

The nomenclature in this article's title parallels the phrase law of total variance.  Some writers on probability call this the "conditional covariance formula" or use other names.

Note: The conditional expected values E( X | Z ) and E( Y | Z ) are random variables whose values depend on the value of Z.  Note that the conditional expected value of X given the event  Z = z is a function of z.  If we write E( X | Z = z) = g(z) then the random variable E( X | Z ) is g(Z). Similar comments apply to the conditional covariance.

Proof

The law of total covariance can be proved using the law of total expectation:  First,

from a simple standard identity on covariances.  Then we apply the law of total expectation by conditioning on the random variable Z:

Now we rewrite the term inside the first expectation using the definition of covariance:

Since expectation of a sum is the sum of expectations, we can regroup the terms:

Finally, we recognize the final two terms as the covariance of the conditional expectations E[X | Z] and E[Y | Z]:

See also
Law of total variance, a special case corresponding to X = Y.
Law of total cumulance, of this the law of total covariance is a special case.

Notes and references 

Algebra of random variables
Covariance and correlation
Articles containing proofs
Theory of probability distributions
Theorems in statistics
Statistical laws